Ozothamnus × expansifolius is a species of Ozothamnus. It is a small pine-like plant, it has flowers that are white or reddish-brown, and the fruit achene grows on it. The plant's habitat is on mountain slopes and heaths at altitudes of 900-1200m. It can tolerate snowfalls and it can adapt to semi-shaded or sunny places. It is a hybrid of O. ledifolius and O. hookeri. The common name of the plant is crowded-leaf everlasting.

External links
Australia National Botanic Gardens
Understory Network

expansifolius
Plant nothospecies